Richard Colin Brake (born 30 November 1964) is a Welsh-American character actor, known for his supporting roles as Joe Chill in Batman Begins (2005), Doom-Head in 31 (2016), and the chemist in Mandy (2018), as well as his lead role as Bob Reid in Perfect Skin (2018). He also had supporting roles on television as the Night King on the fourth and fifth seasons of Game of Thrones, as Conrad Harlow on the first season of Absentia, and as Anton Kaledin in the third series of Peaky Blinders.

Early life
Brake was born in Ystrad Mynach, Wales. In 1964, he and his family migrated to the United States, where they first settled in Atlanta. He then grew up in the states of North Carolina, Tennessee, and Ohio, attending Western Reserve Academy in Hudson, Ohio, and Duke University in Durham, North Carolina. Brake studied acting under Sam Kogan, at his Academy of the Science of Acting and Directing in London, and Beatrice Straight, at the Michael Chekhov Studio in New York City.

Career
In 1993, he made his screen acting debut as a reporter on an episode of the British comedy series Jeeves and Wooster. In 1994, Brake and actress Rachel Weisz both made their film debuts in the science-fiction horror film Death Machine, which starred Brad Dourif. Following supporting roles in a few low-budget films (including Subterfuge, co-starring Matt McColm), Brake did not appear in a single film until six years later when he landed his first role by a major film distributor in Anthony Minghella's civil war film Cold Mountain. He played the leader of a group of Union foragers who attempts to rape the young widow Sara (played by Natalie Portman). The film was released on Christmas Day 2003 and was a critical and commercial success, receiving seven Academy Award nominations.

In 2005, Brake finally achieved recognition from mainstream audiences in Christopher Nolan's Batman Begins. He played Joe Chill, the man responsible for murdering the parents of Bruce Wayne (played by Christian Bale), which leads him to become the vigilante Batman. The film was released on June 15, 2005, to critical acclaim and was nominated for the Academy Award for Best Cinematography, losing to Memoirs of a Geisha. Brake appeared as the warped and perverted space Marine Dean Portman in Doom, with Karl Urban and Dwayne Johnson. He appeared as a hostile American man in Steven Spielberg's Munich, a cinematic retelling of the Munich massacre in the midst of the 1972 Summer Olympics. The film received positive reviews and was nominated for five Academy Awards, including Best Picture, losing to Crash.

In 2006, Brake appeared in the music video for Muse's Knights of Cydonia, playing a villainous sheriff in a strange futuristic western. Brake played paroled convict Bobby DeWitt in Brian De Palma's The Black Dahlia, a fictional account of the murder of actress Elizabeth Short. Despite being a critical and commercial failure, the film received a nomination for the Academy Award for Best Cinematography, losing to Pan's Labyrinth. In 2007, he had a supporting role in Hannibal Rising, which was based on the 2006 novel of the same name by Thomas Harris. He played Enrikas Dortlich, one of the war criminals who murders Mischa Lecter, the younger sister of psychiatrist-turned-cannibalistic killer Hannibal Lecter (played by Gaspard Ulliel) .

In 2008, he played ex-Marine Prior in the horror film Outpost. In 2009, following a guest appearance on the crime drama Cold Case and a supporting role as the titular character in Perkins' 14, he appeared in Rob Zombie's Halloween II, the sequel to his remake of Halloween. He plays Gary Scott, a sleazy and perverted coroner who is brutally decapitated by Michael Myers following a car crash that kills his co-worker. Brake garnered the role based on a personal recommendation to Zombie from actor Sid Haig. Brake made a cameo in the thriller Cuckoo, which premiered at the Cambridge Film Festival on September 25, 2009.

In 2010, he co-starred with Idris Elba in the psychological thriller Legacy, which premiered at the Glasgow Film Festival on February 28, 2010. In 2011, he co-starred with Reese Witherspoon and Robert Pattinson in the romantic drama Water for Elephants, which was based on Sara Gruen's 2006 novel of the same name. The film was released on April 22, 2011, to positive reviews. Brake played Harry Green in the horror film The Incident, where he doesn't have any spoken dialogue throughout the film. The film had its world premiere at the Toronto International Film Festival on September 12, 2011, where it was nominated for the Midnight Madness Award.

In 2013, he had supporting roles in the action thriller The Numbers Station starring John Cusack and Malin Åkerman, and Ridley Scott's crime thriller The Counselor, starring Michael Fassbender and Penélope Cruz. Brake made a cameo in the superhero film Thor: The Dark World, the sequel to Thor. The film became the biggest commercial success for Brake's career, earning $644.6 million at the box office worldwide. Brake had a recurring role as mobster Terry Mandel on Frank Darabont's neo-noir crime drama Mob City. In 2014, he made guest appearances on the crime drama Crossing Lines and the action thriller series Transporter: The Series, both roles he played were international criminals wanted for murder.

From 2014 to 2015, Brake portrayed the Night King on the HBO fantasy series Game of Thrones, appearing in the show's fourth and fifth seasons, most notably in the fifth-season episode "Hardhome", which received seven Emmy nominations. Brake appeared in the action comedy Kingsman: The Secret Service, where he plays an unnamed man who interrogates Eggsy Unwin (played by Taron Egerton) character as part of his training to become a spy for the intelligence agency Kingsman. He made a cameo as a bar patron in the semi-biographical drama Set Fire to the Stars, which premiered at the Edinburgh International Film Festival on June 23, 2014.

In 2015, he appeared on the FX historical fiction drama The Bastard Executioner as Baron Edwin Pryce. Due to scheduling conflicts with The Bastard Executioner, Brake was unable to reprise as The Night King for the sixth season of Game of Thrones and was replaced by Vladimir Furdik, one of the shows main stunt performers. Brake guest-starred on an episode of Grimm as a hunter with a penchant for severing a foot from his victims. He co-starred with Melissa McCarthy and Jason Statham in the action comedy Spy, where he played Solsa Dudaev, a Chechen terrorist in pursuit of a nuclear weapon. The film was universally praised and was nominated for the Golden Globe Award for Best Motion Picture – Musical or Comedy.

Throughout 2016, Brake made guest appearances on several award-winning television shows such as Hawaii Five-0 and Peaky Blinders. He also had a recurring role as Russian mobster Vlad on the Showtime series Ray Donovan. In 2016, he starred as the main antagonist in Rob Zombie's slasher horror film 31. He played Doom-Head, a contract killer who participates in the annual titular game by murdering a group of victims who are kidnapped by goons. The film had its world premiere at the Sundance Film Festival on January 23, 2016. Despite mixed reviews from critics, Brake received enormous praise for his performance and was nominated for the Fangoria Chainsaw Award for Best Supporting Actor, losing to Stephen Lang for Don't Breathe.

In 2017, Brake appeared as Medved in Bitter Harvest and as Tarasov in The Death of Stalin. Although both films focused on Soviet revolutionary and dictator Joseph Stalin, the former was more preoccupied with the Holodomor. While the former was panned by critics, the latter received widespread praise. Brake had a recurring role on the crime thriller series Absentia as Conrad Harlow, a wealthy banker who is released from prison after FBI agent Emily Byrne (played by Stana Katic), who was hunting him down for the murders of several women, is found alive.

In 2018, he landed his first lead role in the psychological horror-thriller Perfect Skin, which premiered at Frightfest London on August 25, 2018. He played Bob Reid, a tattoo artist who, after the dissolution of his marriage as a result of being diagnosed with Parkinson's, kidnaps a Polish immigrant and tattoos her body in attempt to create one last piece of art before he dies. Brake's performance was critically acclaimed and was regarded as the best of his career. He subsequently won the Best Actor award at the First Glance Film Festival and the Vancouver Badass Film Festival for his performance.

Brake co-starred with Nicolas Cage and Andrea Riseborough in the horror film Mandy, which premiered at the Sundance Film Festival on January 19, 2018. He later appeared as Rex in the western The Sisters Brothers, starring John C. Reilly and Joaquin Phoenix as the titular characters. The film had its world premiere at the Venice Film Festival on September 2. He also co-starred with Blake Lively and Sterling K. Brown in the thriller film The Rhythm Section, which was released on January 31, 2020. He played Valin Hess, an Imperial officer, in the seventh episode of the second season of The Mandalorian.

Filmography

Film

Television

Video games

Music video

Short film

Awards and nominations

References

External links

20th-century American male actors
21st-century American male actors
21st-century Welsh male actors
1964 births
American male film actors
American male television actors
Living people
Male actors from California
People from Hengoed
Welsh emigrants to the United States
Western Reserve Academy alumni